Heterangaeus is a genus of hairy-eyed craneflies (family Pediciidae) from the Russian far east (Sakhalin & Kuril Islands), North Korea and Japan.

Species
Heterangaeus esakii Alexander, 1924
Heterangaeus gloriosus (Alexander, 1924)
Heterangaeus japonicus (Alexander, 1919)
Heterangaeus laticinctus Alexander, 1931
Heterangaeus pallidellus Alexander, 1933
Heterangaeus spectabilis Alexander, 1924

References

 

Pediciidae
Tipuloidea genera